The 2022 Zinsser SmartCoat 200 was the seventh stock car race of the 2022 ARCA Menards Series season, the third race of the 2022 Sioux Chief Showdown, and the 22nd iteration of the event. The race was held on Saturday, June 18, 2022, in Marne, Michigan at Berlin Raceway, a 0.438 mile (0.705 km) permanent tri-oval racetrack. The race took the scheduled 200 laps to complete. Daniel Dye, driving for GMS Racing, dominated the entire race, leading 192 laps. After suffering a mechanical problem with ten laps to go, Sammy Smith, driving for Kyle Busch Motorsports, would take over the lead, and earn his first career ARCA Menards Series win in only his sixth start. To fill out the podium, Tom Hessert III and Jesse Love, both driving for Venturini Motorsports, would finish 2nd and 3rd, respectively.

Background 
Berlin Raceway is a 7/16 mile long paved oval race track in Marne, Michigan, near Grand Rapids. The track races weekly as part of NASCAR's Whelen All-American Series. It currently hosts a race in the ARCA Menards Series East tour. The track has held touring series events on the ARCA Menards Series, American Speed Association National Tour, USAC Stock Cars, USAC Silver Crown, World of Outlaws Sprint cars, and World of Outlaws Late Model Series tours.

The track opened in 1950. It was originally a horse track before World War II. Berlin's current track record is 12.513 seconds, set by Brian Gerster in 2018 in a winged sprint car. Berlin Raceway takes its name from the city of Marne's original name "Berlin," which was changed due to Anti-German sentiment following World War I.

Entry list 

 (R) denotes rookie driver

Practice 
The only 45-minute practice session was held on Saturday, June 18, at 4:15 PM EST.

Qualifying 
Qualifying was held on Saturday, June 18, at 6:00 PM EST. The qualifying system used is a single-car, two-lap system with only one round. Whoever sets the fastest time in the round wins the pole. 

Full qualifying results

Race results

Standings after the race 

Drivers' Championship standings

Note: Only the first 10 positions are included for the driver standings.

References 

2022 ARCA Menards Series
Zinsser SmartCoat 200
Zinsser SmartCoat 200